Dover Street Market is a multi-brand retailer originally located on Dover Street, in Mayfair, London. It has stores in New York City, Tokyo, Singapore, Beijing and Los Angeles.

Dover Street Market was created by Rei Kawakubo of Japanese fashion label Comme des Garçons and her husband Adrian Joffe. The store sells all Comme des Garçons brands, as well as complementary high fashion and streetwear brands such as Balenciaga, Brain Dead, Céline, Daniela Gregis, Dreamland Syndicate, Golf Wang, Gucci, Hussein Chalayan, J.W.Anderson, Lanvin, LOEWE, Maison Margiela, Marni, Nike, Proenza Schouler, Ovelia Transtoto, Raf Simons, Rick Owens, Roberts Wood, sacai, Stüssy, The Row, Thom Browne, Valentino, Vans, Vetements, Common Projects, Supreme, Noah, Palace, PACCBET, gr-uniforma and many other brands.

Concept 
Dover Street Market is a retailer that mainly sells high fashion products, but also features items from more urban, streetwear brands. The concept of Dover Street Market was largely based upon the Kensington Market that was the fashion hub for Britain for over 40 years. Taking from Kensington Market, Rei Kawakubo and Adrian Joffe sought to create a store that aimed to be a stockist for their own brand, Comme des Garçons, as well as other brands and designers that they saw fit to curate their store with. The aesthetic direction that Kawakubo and Joffe had in mind was a very unorthodox approach compared to how usual high department stores looked like. With their particular direction in mind, Dover Street Market over the years has collaborated with the Frieze Art Fair, the Michael Hoppen Gallery, and the Institute of Contemporary Arts (ICA) to showcase work throughout the store. Kawakubo described Dover Street Market as "beautiful chaos".

Collaboration 
Dover Street Market has worked on a wide variety of collaborations from various streetwear and high fashion brands. Many collaborations are in celebration of milestones or to commemorate the opening of a new Dover Street Market store. Frequent collaborators include Commes des Garçons, Gucci, Nike, Palace, and Stüssy.

15th Anniversary "MONOCHROMARKET" Capsule 
On 29 November 2019 Dover Street Market's largest collaboration to date was released. The multi-brand capsule titled MONOCHROMARKET had various pieces consisting of clothes, accessories, jewelry, and accessories. Each of the pieces from the collaboration share a monochromatic motif to go with the overall theme of the capsule. The collaboration was split into two releases with the first one releasing online and then later a physical release at their London location. Of the 60 brands partaking in the collaboration, some of the more notable ones consist of A Bathing Ape, Anti Social Social Club, Bottega Veneta, Comme des Garçons, Kaws, Lacoste, Nike, Palace, sacai, Stüssy, The North Face, Undercover, and Vans.

History

The first Dover Street Market opened on 10 September 2004 on 17–18 Dover Street, in Mayfair, London. In March 2016 the original store relocated to the former Burberry building (erected in 1912 by Thomas Burberry) on Haymarket (South Piccadilly).

The original Dover Street Market (17-18 Dover Street, London) used to be home of the Institute of Contemporary Arts (ICA) in May 1950.

The London store was ranked by Complex as the #2 best store in the world in 2013.

Locations
Locations outside London include:

 Dover Street Market Ginza opened in 2012 in Tokyo.
 Dover Street Market New York opened in December 2013 in Manhattan's Murray Hill in the old New York School of Applied Design building at 160 Lexington Avenue.
 Dover Street Market Singapore in a former British Army barracks on Dempsey Hill, opened in July 2017. It is the only ground-floor only location, and has a 12,325 square-feet landscape.
 Dover Street Market Beijing, turned into a Dover Street Market in February 2018, previously a joint venture of I.T and Dover Street Market called I.T Beijing Market.
 Dover Street Market Los Angeles opened fall 2018 in the Arts District.
Dover Street Parfums Market opened in October 2019 in Paris, Just a few minutes walk away from the Musée Picasso. Dover Street Parfums Market is the first location to only exclusively sell beauty and cosmetic products.

The London, Tokyo, Los Angeles, and New York stores all have a Rose Bakery café, created by Rose Carrarini and her husband Jean Charles.

See also
10 Corso Como
Colette

References

External links 

Retail companies based in London
Companies based in the City of Westminster
Luxury brands
Clothing retailers of England
Clothing companies of England
Clothing companies based in London
2004 establishments in the United Kingdom
Retail companies established in 2004
Clothing companies established in 2004